Currently available on Wikipedia are the following Italian designers

A
Franco Albini
Giorgio Armani
Sergio Asti
Gae Aulenti

B
Mario Bellini
Claudio Bellini
Harry Bertoia
Cini Boeri
Stefano Boeri
Osvaldo Borsani
Andrea Branzi

C
Robby Cantarutti
Clino Trini Castelli
Achille Castiglioni
Livio Castiglioni
Pier Giacomo Castiglioni
Roberto Cavalli
Aldo Cibic
Antonio Citterio
Joe Colombo

D
Dolce and Gabbana
Michele De Lucchi

F

Battista Farina
Fendi
Salvatore Ferragamo
Anna Castelli Ferrieri
Andrea Fogli
Gianfranco Frattini

G
Eugenio Gerli
Dante Giacosa
Roberto Giolito
Giorgetto Giugiaro
Gucci

H 

 Franca Helg

I 

 Giancarlo Iliprandi

L 

 Piero Lissoni

M
Vico Magistretti
Angelo Mangiarotti
Enzo Mari
Paolo Martin
Stefano Marzano
Alberto Meda
Alessandro Mendini
Bruno Munari
Missoni
Moschino

N
Paola Navone
Emanuele Nicosia
Marcello Nizzoli
Vito Noto
Fabio Novembre

P
Gaetano Pesce
Roberto Pezzetta
Marco Piva
Gio Ponti
Mario Prada
Emilio Pucci

R
Lorenzo Ramaciotti
Willy Rizzo
Ernesto Nathan Rogers
Aldo Rossi

S
Bruno Sacco
Afra and Tobia Scarpa
Mara Servetto
Walter de Silva
Ettore Sottsass

T
Fabio Taglioni
Massimo Tamburini
Marco Tencone
Matteo Thun

V
Lella Vignelli
Massimo Vignelli
Gianni Versace

Z
Ugo Zagato
Marco Zanuso
Ermenegildo Zegna

Designers